Notre-Dame-du-Portage is a municipality in the Canadian province of Quebec located at the edge of the Saint Lawrence River in the Bas-Saint-Laurent region. It is part of the Rivière-du-Loup Regional County Municipality and home to the Riviere-du-Loup Golf Club.

Main sights
Notre-Dame-du-Portage is a member of the Association of the Most Beautiful Villages of Quebec. Its Roman Catholic Church was constructed in 1859.

See also
 List of municipalities in Quebec

References

External links
 Notre-Dame-du-Portage at the Association of the Most Beautiful Villages of Quebec
 Notre-Dame-du-Portage, Quebec Community Demographics from Industry Canada

External links
 

Incorporated places in Bas-Saint-Laurent
Municipalities in Quebec
Canada geography articles needing translation from French Wikipedia